The Clactonian is the name given by archaeologists to an industry of European flint tool manufacture that dates to the early part of the interglacial period known as the Hoxnian, the Mindel-Riss or the Holstein stages (c. 400,000 years ago). Clactonian tools were made by Homo heidelbergensis.

It is named after 400,000-year-old finds made by Hazzledine Warren in a palaeochannel at Clacton-on-Sea in the English county of Essex in 1911. The artifacts found there included flint chopping tools, flint flakes and the tip of a worked wooden shaft along with the remains of a giant elephant and hippopotamus. Further examples of the tools have been found at sites including Barnfield Pit and Rickson's Pit, near Swanscombe in Kent and Barnham in Suffolk; similar industries have been identified across Northern Europe. The Clactonian industry involved striking thick, irregular flakes from a core of flint, which was then employed as a chopper. The flakes would have been used as crude knives or scrapers. Unlike the Oldowan tools from which Clactonian ones derived, some were notched, implying that they were attached to a handle or shaft. Retouch is uncommon and the prominent bulb of percussion on the flakes indicates use of a hammerstone.

An "Egyptian version" of the Clactonian industry was proposed in 1972, based on excavations on the banks of the Nile River, at the 100 foot terrace.

The Clactonian controversy
The Clactonian industry may have co-existed with the Acheulean industry, which used identical basic techniques but which also had handaxe technology; tools made by bifacially working a flint core. 

The justification for considering "Clactonian" as a tradition distinct from Acheulean has been called into question in a 1994 article.
The Clactonian industry may in fact be the same thing as the Acheulean and only assessed as being different due to its tools being Acheulean ones made by individuals who had no need for handaxes on the occasion that they made them. Differences in environment and the availability and quality of local raw materials may account for the differences between the two industries, which, at one point it was inferred, were only perceived by modern archaeologists. 

However, the 2004 excavation of a butchered Pleistocene elephant at the Southfleet Road site of High Speed 1 in Kent recovered numerous Clactonian flint tools but no handaxes. As a handaxe would have been more useful than a chopper in dismembering an elephant carcass it is considered strong evidence of the Clactonian being a separate industry. 
Flint of sufficient quality was available in the area and it is likely that the people who carved up the elephant did not possess the knowledge to make the more advanced bifacial handaxe.
Proponents of the Clactonian as an independent industry point to the lack of concrete evidence in favour of it being an anomalous Acheulean industry. The precise provenance of the few attributed bifacial Clactonian tools (which point to Acheulean influence) is in dispute.

The traditional chronology of Clactonian being followed by Acheulean is also being increasingly challenged since finds of Acheulean tools were made at Boxgrove in Sussex and High Lodge in Suffolk. 
These finds came from deposits connected with the Anglian Stage, the glaciation that preceded the Hoxnian Stage and therefore would have preceded the Clactonian. Whether or not they are separate industries it would seem that the 'Clactonian' and 'Acheulean' stone tool makers would have had cultural contact with each other.

See also

 Acheulean

References

Further reading
 Butler, C, Prehistoric Flintwork, Tempus : Strood, 2005

External links
Drawings of Clactonian tools
"Stone Age elephant remains found"

Archaeological cultures of Europe
European archaeology
Archaeological artefact groups
Homo heidelbergensis
Archaeological cultures in England